Phong Châu was the capital of Vietnam for the most part of the Hồng Bàng dynasty.

Phong Châu may also refer to:
, a ward of Phú Thọ town in Phú Thọ Province
, a township and capital of Phù Ninh District in Phú Thọ Province
, a rural commune of Trùng Khánh District
, a rural commune of Đông Hưng District
, a former district of Vĩnh Phú Province

See also
Fengzhou (disambiguation)